Deutsche Schule Algarve (DSA;  is a German international school in Silves, Algarve, Portugal. It serves grundschule (primary school) until grades 11–12.

References

External links
  Deutsche Schule Algarve
  Deutsche Schule Algarve

Buildings and structures in the Algarve
Algarve
Silves, Portugal